Hydnocarpus alpinus is a species of plant in the Achariaceae family. It is found in China, Laos, and Vietnam. It is threatened by habitat loss.

Varieties
Hydnocarpus alpinus may include:
 Hydnocarpus alpina var. elongata Boerl.
 Hydnocarpus alpina var. macrocarpa Boerl.

References

alpina
Vulnerable plants